Uriminzokkiri is a North Korean state-controlled news website, much of whose content is syndicated from other news groups within the country, such as KCNA. Aside from on their own website, Uriminzokkiri also distributes information over Flickr, Twitter, and Youku. Uriminzokkiri's official website is blocked in South Korea, and the group previously operated accounts on Facebook and YouTube until both were terminated.

History
Uriminzokkiri was launched in 2003 from a server in Shanghai. It was the first website established by North Korea.

In August 2010, Uriminzokkiri launched YouTube, Facebook, and Twitter accounts in an effort to improve North Korea's image around the world. Uriminzokkiri maintains an account on the Chinese video platform Youku, and has uploaded more than 14,000 videos.

On 3 April 2013, hacker group Anonymous claimed it had stolen 15,000 user passwords as part of a cyberwar against the DPRK. Several hours later, Anonymous claimed responsibility for hacking into the Uriminzokkiri website and its Twitter and Flickr accounts.

In January 2017 the American internet platform YouTube temporarily terminated Uriminzokkiri's YouTube Channel, due to legal complaints without stating any further information.

Popular incidents and news articles 
On 18 September 2012, Uriminzokkiri uploaded a video containing a photoshopped image of South Korea's president-elect Park Geun-hye performing the dance moves of "Gangnam Style". The video also mocks her as a devoted admirer of the Yushin system of autocratic rule set up by her father, Park Chung-hee.

On 5 February 2013, a film that featured New York City in flames was removed from YouTube after a Digital Millennium Copyright Act complaint filed by Activision due to the use of footage from Call of Duty: Modern Warfare 3. On 19 March 2013, a new North Korean propaganda video was posted on the Uriminzokkiri YouTube channel that presented images of an imagined missile attack on U.S. government buildings in Washington, D.C., including the White House and the Capitol.

On 21 May 2013, Uriminzokkiri claimed that North Korea's threat to target the Blue House (using unmanned aerial vehicles instead of surface-to-surface missiles) was intended to use "terrain features for cover". It also pointed out that the UAVs are capable of hitting the Blue House in less than three minutes travelling at 925 km/h. The website further boasted that North Korean drones are also capable of attacking the Capital Defence Command on the southern side of Mount Kwanak in southern Seoul. South Korea's top brass ignored these imminent provocations, just as they did in 2010 before the sinking of the Navy corvette Cheonan.

On 24 March 2014, weeks after Australian missionary John Short was deported from North Korea for "anti-state" religious acts, Uriminzokkiri released an article using biblical terms and references to describe the country as a utopian paradise. Titled "Korea is a human paradise in which Jesus would have nothing to do even if he came", the article portrays North Korea as a land with free healthcare, free education, and no taxes thanks to Kim Jong-un. The article claimed that its title is a direct quote from an American religious figure who visited North Korea but is not named throughout the article.

Etymology
There does not seem to be any definitive translation of "Uriminzokkiri" into English. The Uriminzokkiri website itself proffers no English translation. The translation "on our own as a nation" has been used by a major newspaper. A relatively literal translation would be "Our People (or Peoples) Together/As One", "Bringing Our Nation(s) Together", or "We the [Korean] People".

See also

DPRK Today
Naenara

References

External links

North Korean news websites